Somalia is officially divided into 18 administrative regions (gobollo, singular gobol) .  These are in turn subdivided into seventy-two districts (plural degmooyin; singular degmo)

On a de facto basis, northern Somalia is now divided up among the autonomous region of Puntland (which considers itself an autonomous state) and Somaliland (a self-declared but unrecognized sovereign state). In central Somalia, Galmudug is another regional entity that emerged south of Puntland.  For these civil war divisions, see States and regions of Somalia.

Regions and districts

Historical divisions

Pre-independence
In 1931, Italian Somaliland consisted of seven commissariats.
 Alto Giuba
 Alto Uebi-Scebeli
 Basso Giuba
 Basso Uebi-Scebeli
 Migiurtinia
 Mogadiscio
 Mudugh

Following the 1935–36 Second Italo-Abyssinian War, Italian Somaliland became part of Italian East Africa with Abyssinia (Ethiopia) and Eritrea. Italian Somaliland was one of six governorates of the new colony, the Somalia Governorate, and incorporated Somali-inhabited parts of the former Abyssinia. The governorate was subdivided into 10 commissariats, which were themselves divided into residencies.

 Alto Giuba (English: Upper Juba)  (capital: Baidoa)
 Alto Scebeli (Upper Shabele)  (Bulo Burti)
 Basso Scebeli (Lower Shabele)  (Merca)
 Migiurtinia (Migiurtinia)  (Dante)
 Mogadiscio (Mogadishu)  (Mogadiscio)
 Mudugh (Mudug)  (Rocca Littorio)
 Ogaden (Ogaden) (Uarder)
 Uebi Gestro (Gestro River)  (Callafo)
 Basso Giuba (Lower Juba)  (Chisimaio)
 Nogal (Nugaal)  (Eil)

Following World War II, the Italian-administered Trust Territory of Somalia consisted of six Regions.
 Alto Giuba
 Basso Giuba
 Benadir
 Hiiraan
 Migiurtinia
 Mudugh

The British Somaliland protectorate also consisted of two Regions.

 Burao
 Hargeisa

Somalia
Upon independence in 1960, the Somali Republic maintained the 12 districts of the former Italian Somaliland and British Somaliland that merged to form the new country. In 1964, a new Northeastern (Burao) Province was established by merging Burao, Erigavo, and Las Anod and a Northwestern (Hargeisa) Province was formed from Berbera, Borama, and Hargeisa districts. In 1968, the capital of Basso Giuba was moved from Kismayo to Jamame. The 8 provinces at this time were:

In 1982, Somalia reorganized from eight provinces into 16 regions.  In June 1984, Awdal was split from Woqooyi Galbeed and Sool was split from Nugaal to form the current 18 regions.

See also

States and regions of Somalia
List of regions of Somalia by Human Development Index
ISO 3166-2:SO

References

 
Somalia
Somalia
Somalia geography-related lists
Somalia